The Möhlinbach is a 15 kilometer long stream in Aargau canton, Switzerland.

Rivers of Switzerland
Rivers of Aargau